Duniya may refer to:

Arts and entertainment
 Duniya (1968 film), a Hindi romantic thriller
 Duniya (1984 film), a Hindi film 
 Duniya (2007 film), an Indian Kannada-language film 
 Duniya (album), a 1997 album by Raageshwari Loomba.
 Duniya (The Intrinsic Passion of Mysterious Joy), a 1994 album by Loop Guru

People
 Duniya Soori, Indian film director
 Duniya Vijay (born 1974), Indian actor

See also 
 Dunia (disambiguation)
 Dunya (disambiguation)
 Dunja (disambiguation)